Gornje Hrasno is a settlement in the Neum municipality, in Bosnia and Herzegovina.

Demographics 
According to the 1991 census, it had a total of 186 inhabitants, out of which 108 were Serbs (58,06%); 73 were Croats (39,25%) and 5 were ethnic Muslims (2,69%). It was the only settlement in Neum with a Serb majority.

According to the 2013 census, its population was 53.

References

Populated places in Neum